The 1934 Dayton Flyers football team was an American football team that represented the University of Dayton as a member of the Ohio Athletic Conference during the 1934 college football season. In its 12th season under head coach Harry Baujan, the team compiled a 4–3–1 record.

Schedule

References

Dayton
Dayton Flyers football seasons
Dayton Flyers football